Amphinemura is a genus of spring stoneflies in the family Nemouridae. There are about 18 described species in Amphinemura.

Species
 Amphinemura alabama Baumann, 1996
 Amphinemura apache Baumann and Gaufin, 1972
 Amphinemura appalachia Baumann, 1996
 Amphinemura banksi Baumann and Gaufin, 1972
 Amphinemura delosa (Ricker, 1952)
 Amphinemura linda (Ricker, 1952)
 Amphinemura mexicana Baumann, 1972
 Amphinemura mockfordi (Ricker, 1952)
 Amphinemura mogollonica Baumann and Gaufin, 1972
 Amphinemura nigritta (Provancher, 1876) (little black forestfly)
 Amphinemura puebla Baumann, 1972
 Amphinemura reinerti Baumann, 1976
 Amphinemura sulcicollis (Stephens, 1836)
 Amphinemura texana Baumann, 1996
 Amphinemura varshava (Ricker, 1952)
 Amphinemura venusta (Banks, 1911)
 Amphinemura verrucosa Zwick, 1973
 Amphinemura wui (Claassen, 1936) (spiked forestfly)

References

Further reading

 
 

Nemouridae